is a Japanese manga artist. His first big hit was a romantic comedy B Virgin, and he is also known for the manga adaptation of Zebraman. He is very concerned with societal problems, and has spent the last several years drawing Zetsubō ni Kiku Kusuri, a series of manga interviews with people he believes are setting a positive example.

Works

References

External links
  

Manga artists from Tokyo
Living people
People from Tokyo
1966 births